"Second Hand Heart" is a song written by Mark Gray, Harold Tipton and Craig Karp, and recorded by American country music artist Gary Morris.  It was released in July 1984 as the second single from the album Faded Blue.  The song reached #7 on the Billboard Hot Country Singles & Tracks chart.

Chart positions

References

1984 singles
Gary Morris songs
Songs written by Mark Gray (singer)
Song recordings produced by Jim Ed Norman
Warner Records singles
1984 songs